Agathis flavescens is a species of conifer in the family Araucariaceae. It is sometimes considered a variety of Agathis dammara.

Agathis flavescens is found only in remote parts of the Peninsular Malaysia. Less than 1,000 mature individuals are likely to exist in three separate populations. An area where specimens frequently display yellowing leaves is suggestive of poor nutrient conditions.

References

flavescens
Vulnerable plants
Endemic flora of Peninsular Malaysia
Trees of Peninsular Malaysia
Taxonomy articles created by Polbot